Edward Payson Washburn (1831 – March 26, 1860) was an American painter, son of Indian missionary Cephas Washburn. He is best known for his 1856 work, The Arkansas Traveller.

Biography

Edward Payson Washburn painted the image of the "Arkansas Traveler" from a story he heard from Colonel Sandford C. Faulkner. Supposedly occurring on the campaign trail in Arkansas in 1840, Colonel Faulkner's humorous story ends with a fiddle playing squatter being won over by the traveler (man on horse in image).

The painting was later a basis of engravings by Leopold Grozelier of Boston in 1859, and Currier and Ives of New York City about 1870, with a sample from the Arkansas Traveler tune. In addition to the painting and prints, the story of the Arkansas Traveler was also turned into a tune, dialogue and play.

It was created just south of the town of Russellville, Arkansas, at the Washburn family homestead site. Washburn cemetery, near the old homestead, still exists today. The painting was widely distributed as a Currier & Ives lithograph. It was inspired by the composition of the same name by Colonel Sanford C. Faulkner (1806–1874).

Washburn died in Little Rock, Arkansas, only nine days after his father, and is buried at Mount Holly Cemetery.

References

External links 

 
 

1831 births
1860 deaths
19th-century American painters
19th-century American male artists
American male painters
Artists from Arkansas